Dirty rap (also known as porno rap, porn rap, sex rap, booty rap, or pornocore) is a subgenre of hip hop music that contains lyrical content revolving mainly around sexually explicit subjects.

The lyrics are often overtly explicit and graphic, sometimes to the point of being comical or offensive. Historically, dirty rap often contained a distinctly bass-driven sound, which arose from the popular Miami bass rap scene. However, dirty rap has recently been heavily influenced by Baltimore club, ghetto house, and ghettotech. Many dirty rap songs have been used as soundtracks to pornographic movies since the 2000s, replacing the traditional porn groove.

Late 1980s and early 1990s dirty rap
Though the genre had been around since at least the late 1970s, with Blowfly's Rapp Dirty, it was not until the 1980s, when Oakland rapper Too Short released the 1983 album Don't Stop Rappin' containing multiple dirty sex subjects, that sex became a central focus. Although the release did not see much attention outside of his hometown of Oakland, he would continue to use provocative and sexual lyrics throughout his career, gaining him six platinum albums and three gold. The controversial rap group 2 Live Crew brought "dirty rap" to the mainstream with their Miami bass debut 2 Live Crew Is What We Are. With the graphic sexual content of their X-rated party rhymes, 2 Live Crew garnered much negative publicity. However, it wasn't until their 1989 album, As Nasty as They Wanna Be, that dirty rap became a legitimate genre. After being attacked by conservative critics, censors, and attorneys, 2 Live Crew responded with the 1990 album Banned in the USA, a much more political and angry album.

2 Live Crew returned to their utterly pornographic roots with 1991's Sports Weekend: As Nasty as They Wanna Be, Pt. 2, which was lambasted by many critics as running the sexually deviant lyrics of As Nasty As They Wanna Be into the ground. From Sport's Weekend onward, the Crew continued to make dirty rap and party rap.

Various rappers followed with dirty rap in the wake of 2 Live Crew's popularity. The group Poison Clan became widely successful, as did the group Bytches With Problems. Salt-N-Pepa released several "dirty rap" songs in the late 1980s and early 1990s. Sir Mix-A-Lot's 1992 hit single "Baby Got Back" could arguably be considered within the dirty rap genre; however, the majority of Mix-A-Lot's work is not sexually explicit enough for him to be considered a true dirty rap artist. Similarly, the new jack swing hip hop group Wreckx-n-Effect scored a dirty rap hit with their 1992 single "Rump Shaker." The pimp rapper Too Short is also a notable contributor and beginner to dirty rap music since he began his first album in 1983, though his topics range from sex to the gangster lifestyle.

In the early 1990s, the Baltimore club scene first began gaining an identity separate from house music and mainstream hip hop. Baltimore club, or gutter music, often features sexually explicit lyrics, and has influenced many current dirty rappers. Both ghettotech and ghetto house (or "booty house") also evolved around the same time, and, to an even greater extent than Baltimore club, frequently contain pornographic and sexually explicit content, as exemplified by DJ Assault and DJ Funk, two artists who pioneered ghettotech and ghetto house, respectively.

White dirty rappers include the Russian group Malchishnik, active between 1989 and 1994 and known for their song "Seks-kontrol" ("Sex Control"), a diatribe against interracial sex.

Contemporary dirty rap
Dirty rap was a popular subgenre into the 1990s and 2000s, particular in Southern hip hop. Luke Campbell of 2 Live Crew continued to produce dirty rap as a solo artist into the 2000s.

Kool Keith described the lyrical content of his 1997 album Sex Style as "pornocore". The album features Keith variously portraying himself as characters ranging from pimps to perverts. Keith also uses sexual metaphors to diss other rappers, many of which involve urolagnia. Kool Keith later appeared on the 2001 album Porn Again, a dirty rap or pornocore concept album by The Smut Peddlers. The Smut Peddlers consisted of Mr. Eon and DJ Mighty Mi from The High & Mighty and rapper Cage.

In 2001, Afroman released the comical rap single "Crazy Rap," a song in which he describes sexual activities such as anal intercourse in heavy detail.

Khia's hit single "My Neck My Back" (from her 2002 album Thug Misses) later achieved CHR status – being played on Top 40 radio.

The genre made a strong comeback in the Southern hip hop (or "Dirty South") scene starting in the late 1990s and peaking in about 2005 with two hit singles, Ying-Yang Twins' sexually explicit "Wait (The Whisper Song)", as well as David Banner's dirty single, "Play," both produced by the "father of snap", Mr. Collipark. Southern rapper Plies has released several dirty rap singles, such as "Becky" and "Fucking or What". Most of Plies' work focuses on drugs and violence and he is not a full-time dirty artist, although almost all the singles released contained dirty rap.

Some examples of dirty rap by East Coast hip hop artists include Akinyele's "Put It in Your Mouth", The Notorious B.I.G.'s  "Nasty Girl", Lil' Kim's "Magic Stick", Bravehearts' "Oochie Wally", 50 Cent's "Candy Shop" and "Ayo Technology", featuring Justin Timberlake, which contains references to looking at porn and urges to perform in bisexual activities. Also notable is "Tush" by Ghostface Killah and Missy Elliott.

Lil Wayne was ranked one of the dirtiest rappers by Billboard in 2012.

Dirty rap saw another resurgence in the 2010s, particularly in the West Coast hip hop scene. 2014 saw the release of YG's song "Do It To Ya" featuring TeeFlii from the album My Krazy Life, produced by DJ Mustard. DJ Mustard also has the production credit of some of the other more recent dirty rap songs, including a single called "24 Hours" by TeeFlii.

Female artists such as Saweetie, Missy Elliott, Mia X, Lil' Kim, Latto, Flo Milli, Riley Reid, Strings, Gillette, Queen Pen, Azealia Banks, Cupcakke, Foxy Brown, Gangsta Boo, Shawnna, Khia, Lil' Slow, Remy Ma, Trina, Nicki Minaj, Cardi B, Doja Cat, City Girls, Brooke Candy, Amil, Miami-based Jacki-O, Heather Hunter, Erica Banks, and Megan Thee Stallion are prominent dirty rappers in the once male-dominated genre. CupcakKe rose to fame in late 2015 with her single, "Deepthroat". The dirty music video amassed millions of views on YouTube as well as millions more through other video sharing sites such as WorldStarHipHop and Facebook. All six of her albums and mixtapes have a main theme of dirty rap and sexually explicit lyrics.

Many indie rappers, such as Spank Rock, Bonde Do Role, Plastic Little, Peaches, Amanda Blank, and Yo Majesty, created an underground, electro funk or electroclash and dance-influenced version of dirty rap in the mid to late 2000s, dubbed electro-smut by Spin Magazine. These rappers are heavily influenced by the Baltimore Club and ghettotech scenes.

Megan Thee Stallion and Cardi B's 2020 dirty rap song "WAP" features heavy influence from two genres that have notably contributed to and influenced the "dirty rap" subgenre; the song features both a heavy bass sound reminiscent of Miami bass as well as a prominent sample from a Baltimore club song, specifically from the Baltimore club artist Frank Ski's 1993 single "Whores in This House."

Memphis rapper Moneybagg Yo has also been known to use dirty rap lyrics in many of his songs, many of which are deemed very explicit.

Cupcakke has been considered to be the "horniest rapper of all time" due to her extremely outrageous sexual lyrics.

See also
 Dirty blues

References

Bibliography
 Chang, Jeff. Can't Stop, Won't Stop: A History of the Hip-Hop Generation, Picador USA, 2006, .

External links
 
 
 
 

 
Hip hop genres
Pornography by genre
African-American music